Doodh soda is a Punjabi drink made by mixing a lemon or lime-flavored soda (such as Sprite or 7 Up) with milk. It is a staple in both Pakistan and India, and is especially popular during Ramadan. It is considered to be healthier than regular soda, and is often paired with spicy foods. The combination of soda and milk was first created in Victorian England, and from there it spread to India and Pakistan through the British Empire.

Preparation 
There are multiple methods of creating doodh soda. One method is pouring boiling milk into a metal bucket submerged and spun in a container of ice water. Once chilled, the milk is mixed with the soda. Other times, vendors mix the drink by pouring between glasses, aerating the mixture. At home, people create it by filling a glass with equal parts ice, soda, and milk. Other ingredients are sometimes added in small amounts such as Rooh Afza, fruit syrup, sugar, honey, or the zest of a lemon or lime.

See also 
Cream soda
Dirty soda
Ice cream float

References 

Indian drinks
Pakistani drinks
Punjabi cuisine
Milk-based drinks